"I Didn't Know My Own Strength" is a song written by Rick Bowles and Robert Byrne, and recorded by American country music artist Lorrie Morgan.  It was released in May 1995 as the first single from her compilation album Reflections: Greatest Hits.  The song became Morgan's third and final Number One on the U.S. country singles charts in August 1995.

Charts

Weekly charts

Year-end charts

References

1995 singles
1995 songs
Lorrie Morgan songs
Songs written by Robert Byrne (songwriter)
Songs written by Rick Bowles
Song recordings produced by James Stroud
Music videos directed by Steven Goldmann
BNA Records singles